The 1946 United States Senate election in New York was held on November 5, 1946.

Democratic nomination

Candidates
Herbert H. Lehman, former Governor of New York

Declined
James M. Mead, incumbent Senator (running for Governor)

Convention
The Democratic state convention met on September 4 at Albany. Former Governor Herbert H. Lehman was the only candidate nominated. His name was placed into nomination by Jeremiah T. Mahoney and seconded by former First Lady Eleanor Roosevelt.

Republican nomination

Candidates
William J. Donovan, retired U.S. Army Major General, former Director of the Office of Strategic Services (1942–45) and nominee for Governor in 1932
Irving M. Ives, Majority Leader of the New York State Assembly

Convention
The Republican state convention met on September 4 at Saratoga Springs, New York. Assembly Majority Leader Irving M. Ives was nominated unanimously after General Donovan, facing overwhelming defeat, withdrew that morning and pledged his support to the Republican ticket.

Other nominations

Socialist Labor
The Socialist Labor state convention met on April 7 and nominated Eric Hass for the U.S. Senate. The party filed a petition to nominate its candidates under the name "Industrial Government Party."

Liberal
The Liberal Party of New York nominated Lehmann by gathering 51,015 signatures and filed a petition to nominate candidates with the Secretary of State on September 2.

American Labor
The American Labor state convention met on September 3 and endorsed Lehman.

Others
The Industrial Government, Socialist and Socialist Workers tickets were not allowed on the ballot because of "defective nominating petitions." The Court of Appeals upheld the decisions of the lower courts.

General election

Results
The whole Republican ticket was elected in a landslide.

Obs.: 
"Blank, void and scattering" votes: 178,694

References

1946
New York
United States Senate